Merone is a comune (municipality) in the Province of Como in the Italian region Lombardy, located about  north of Milan and about  southeast of Como.

Merone borders the following municipalities: Costa Masnaga, Erba, Eupilio, Lambrugo, Lurago d'Erba, Monguzzo, Rogeno.

Twin towns — sister cities
Merone is twinned with:

  Noyarey, France, since 2004

References

Cities and towns in Lombardy